Christian Heinrich Bünger (11 October 1782 – 8 December 1842) was professor of anatomy and was the first surgeon to introduce rhinoplasty.

Education

He received his MD in c. 1805 from the University of Helmstedt under Justus Ferdinand Christian Loder and Gottfried Christoph Beireis.

Career

Bünger was professor of anatomy at the University of Marburg. He was an expert and innovator in operations on the nerve, lymph, and arterial systems, especially arterial ligations. He was the first to work out the exact natural positions of the auditory apparatus of animals and humans. Bünger was also a specialist in plastic surgery, especially of the nose and eyelids. He was the first to introduce rhinoplasty. In 1817 Bünger performed the first full thickness Skin grafting.

References 

 Jasper Hein, Christian Heinrich Bünger 1782-1842 Anatom und Chirurg in Marburg, Brosch., Einband lt. fleckig, sonst gt. Zustand., 467 S. Zur Geschichte der Anatomie und Chirurgie. Zahlr. Abb., Tabellen, Faksimile, Mannheim, 1976.
 Biographisches Lexikon der hervorragenden Ärzte, Urban & Schwarzenberg, 1962, vol. 1, pp. 758–759.
  Allgemeine Deutsche Biographie, Duncker & Humblot, 1967-1971 Reprint, vol. 3, p. 540.
  Neuer Nekrolog der Deutschen, 1842, vol. 20(part2), pp. 836–839.

External links
 Bünger library and museum

German anatomists
German surgeons
Physicians from Braunschweig
People from the Duchy of Brunswick
1782 births
1842 deaths
Academic staff of the University of Marburg
University of Helmstedt alumni